Shipbreakers is a 2004 documentary film.  A co-production of the National Film Board of Canada with Storyline Entertainment directed by Michael Kot, the film explores the practice of ship breaking decommissioned vessels in Alang, India.

Awards
Gemini Award for Best Photography in a Documentary Program or Series (Derek Rogers)
Ecofilms Festival First Prize - Golden Deer Award
Golden Sheaf Awards for Best Director Non-fiction and Best Nature/Environment Documentary

References

External links 
 Shipbreakers at the NFB.ca, and 
 

2004 films
National Film Board of Canada documentaries
Films shot in India
Canadian Screen Award-winning television shows
Documentary films about India
Ship breaking
2004 documentary films
2000s English-language films
2000s Canadian films